Angelo Pascal (Turin, August, 1858 – July 18, 1888) was an Italian painter.

Biography
His father was a tailor, and was initially trained as an engineer. He then drifted to studying art at the Accademia Albertina under Andrea Gastaldi. He was eclectic in subjects. In 1883 at Milan, he displayed Bonjour de Mimi and Lettrici a Roma; in 1883, Il giuoco degli sposi; in 1884 at Turin, two female portraits and Dopo il voltzer. In 1881 at Venice, he exhibited a half figure of a woman.

References

19th-century Italian painters
Italian male painters
1858 births
1888 deaths
Accademia Albertina alumni
Painters from Turin
19th-century Italian male artists